"In It for the Money" is a song by the English electronic group Client, released as the lead single from their second studio album, City (2004). The single peaked at number fifty-one on the UK Singles Chart. The B-side "Down to the Underground" features Pete Doherty on vocals.

Track listings
UK CD single (CDTH005)
"In It for the Money" – 3:24
"Down to the Underground" – 3:05
"Burning Up" – 3:56

UK 7" single (TH005)
A. "In It for the Money" – 3:24
B. "Down to the Underground" – 3:05

UK and U.S. 12" single (UK: 12TH005 / U.S.: MUTE 9252-0)
A1. "In It for the Money" (The Grid Static In The Attic Mix) – 7:17
A2. "In It for the Money" (Client vs The Zip Remix) – 4:55
B1. "In It for the Money" (Extended Mix) – 4:52
B2. "In It for the Money" (Grand National Remix) – 4:19

U.S. CD single (MUTE 9252-2)
"In It for the Money" – 3:24
"Down to the Underground" – 3:05
"Burning Up" – 3:56
"In It for the Money" (The Grid Static In The Attic Mix) – 7:17
"In It for the Money" (Client vs The Zip Remix) – 4:55
"In It for the Money" (Extended Mix) – 4:52
"In It for the Money" (Grand National Remix) – 4:19

Charts

References

2004 singles
2004 songs
Client (band) songs
Songs about prostitutes